Jesse Willis Topper (born September 19, 1981) is a Republican member of the Pennsylvania House of Representatives representing the 78th district since 2014.

Early life and education
Topper was born on September 19, 1981 to John and Ruth Topper. He was home schooled, and graduated from Frostburg State University magna cum laude with a bachelor of arts degree in music performance.

Political career 
Topper won a special election on January 28, 2014, to succeed Pennsylvania State Representative Dick Hess, who died during his term. He was reelect to four more consecutive terms. Prior to his election as a state representative, Topper served on the Bedford Borough Council for two years.

Committee assignments
Appropriations Committee (Vice Chair)
Committee On Committees 
Education Committee
Subcommittee on Higher Education (Chair)
Liquor Control Committee 
Rules Committee

Political positions 
Topper is fiscally and socially conservative. He is also pro-life and a "strong supporter" of the Second Amendment. Topper opposes legalizing adult use cannabis in Pennsylvania.

Personal life
Topper is married to Christy Smith, the couple live in Bedford, Pennsylvania and have two sons. He previously served as a minister at a United Methodist Church in his hometown.

References

External links

Living people
Republican Party members of the Pennsylvania House of Representatives
People from Bedford, Pennsylvania
1981 births
21st-century American politicians